Étienne-Paul-Victor Monceaux (29 May 1859 – 7 February 1941) was a 19th-20th-century French historian. A professor at the 
Collège de France from 1907 to 1937, he was elected a member of the Académie des Inscriptions et Belles-Lettres in 1912.
His major speciality was Christian Latinity in the Roman provinces of North Africa.

Selected publications 
1883: Apulée, roman et magie, Paris, Quantin, 
1886: Les proxénies grecques, P., Thorin, VIII+331pp
1889: La restauration d'Olympie ; l'histoire, les monuments, le culte et les fêtes (in collab. with Victor Laloux), P., Quantin
1892: La Grèce avant Alexandre. Étude sur la société grecque du VIe au IVe siècle, P., Quantin
1894: Les Africains. Etude sur la littérature latine d'Afrique : les Païens, P., Lecène, Oudin & Cie, V+500pp
1901–1923: Histoire littéraire de l'Afrique chrétienne depuis les origines jusqu'à l'invasion arabe (7 volumes : Tertullien et les origines - saint Cyprien et son temps - le IV, d'Arnobe à Victorin - le Donatisme - saint Optat et les premiers écrivains donatistes - la littérature donatiste au temps de saint Augustin - saint Augustin et le donatisme), P., Leroux.
1909: Racine

Sources 
 Pierre Courcelle, Paul Monceaux (1859-1941), 1941

External links 
Paul Monceaux on data.bnf.fr
Paul Monceaux on Wikisource

1859 births
People from Auxerre
1941 deaths
19th-century French historians
20th-century French historians
Members of the Académie des Inscriptions et Belles-Lettres
Officiers of the Légion d'honneur
Academic staff of the Collège de France